Lipskerov (feminine: Lipskerova)  is a Russian Jewish surname derived from the Yiddish surname Lipsker. Notable people with the surname include:

Dmitri Lipskerov (born 1964),  Russian Jewish writer and dramatist
 (born 1939) Russian Jewish screenwriter, writer and playwright

See also

Jewish surnames
Russian-language surnames